Periklis Damaskos (born 11 July 1952) is a Greek former water polo player who competed in the 1972 Summer Olympics At club level, he played for Olympiacos. After his retirement, he became a water polo coach.

References

1952 births
Living people
Greek male water polo players
Olympiacos Water Polo Club players
Olympic water polo players of Greece
Water polo players at the 1972 Summer Olympics
Greek water polo coaches